Brylian Negietha Dwiki Aldama or better known as Brylian Aldama (born 23 February 2002) is an Indonesian professional footballer who plays as a central midfielder for Liga 1 club Persebaya Surabaya.

Youth career 
Brylian Aldama launched his footballing career in his hometown of Surabaya through the youth system of Persebaya. After playing for several Indonesian national junior teams in different age groups from 2018 to 2020, he attracted top-flight Croatian club HNK Rijeka that recruited him to play for their youth team in the first half of 2021. After a few non-league matches, he failed to earn a spot on the roster, leading to a loan spell at NK Pomorac 1921, which plays in the third-tier of Croatian football. He played several matches for Pomorac's junior team and even scored goals for them but injuries blocked his progression.

Club career

Persebaya Surabaya 
In 2022, Aldama moved back to Indonesia and signed for the senior team of his childhood club Persebaya Surabaya on 29 April 2022 to play in Liga 1 in the 2022–23 season. He made his league debut on 25 July 2022 in a match against Persikabo 1973 at the Pakansari Stadium, Cibinong.

International career
Aldama was part of the  Indonesia U-17 team that won the 2018 AFF U-16 Youth Championship and the Indonesia U-19 team that finished third in 2019 AFF U-19 Youth Championship.

Career statistics

Club

Notes

Honours

Club 
Persebaya Surabaya U20
 Elite Pro Academy U-20: 2019

International
Indonesia U16
 JENESYS Japan-ASEAN U-16 Youth Football Tournament: 2017
 AFF U-16 Youth Championship: 2018
Indonesia U19
 AFF U-19 Youth Championship third place: 2019

References

External links
 Brylian Aldama at Soccerway
 Brylian Aldama at Liga Indonesia

2002 births
Living people
Sportspeople from Surabaya
Sportspeople from East Java
Indonesian footballers
Indonesia youth international footballers
Liga 1 (Indonesia) players
Persebaya Surabaya players
Association football midfielders
Indonesian expatriate footballers